Data processing modes or computing modes are classifications of different types of computer processing.  
 Interactive computing or Interactive processing, historically introduced as Time-sharing
 Transaction processing
 Batch processing
 Real-time processing

See also 
 Methods of production

References

Computing terminology